Mentone may refer to:

Places
Mentone, Victoria, Australia
Mentone Beach, Port Phillip Bay, Victoria, Australia
Electoral district of Mentone, Victoria, Australia

Menton, France; sometimes known by its Italian name Mentone

United States
Mentone, Alabama
Mentone, California
Mentone, Indiana
Mentone, Texas

Schools
 Mentone Grammar School, Mentone, Melbourne, Victoria, Australia
 Mentone Girls' Grammar School, Mentone, Melbourne, Victoria, Australia
 Mentone Girls' Secondary College, Mentone, Melbourne, Victoria, Australia

Other uses
 Mentone Productions, U.S. film company
 Mentone railway station, Mentone, Melbourne, Victoria, Australia

See also